Persatuan Sepakbola Indonesia Patriot Kota Bekasi (formerly known as PCB Persipasi), is an Indonesian football club based in Bekasi, West Java that competes in Liga 3. Their home base is Patriot Candrabhaga Stadium which is the inspiration for the club name.
In November 2021, Patriot Candrabhaga FC merged with Persipasi Bekasi to form PCB Persipasi and their target is to enter Liga 2. In May 2022, the club reverted their name back into Persipasi as an effort from Askot PSSI Bekasi to mend relations with the club's supporters who had alienated the club after their merger with Patriot Candrabhaga.

History
In 2017, The Mayor of Bekasi formed a new football club called Patriot Chandrabhaga FC. The club was formed with the aim of football lovers in Bekasi, hoping that they can become the pride of the citizens. Since they were first formed, they played in Liga 3, their presence did not get the attention of the people. A number of football lovers, especially Persipasi's supporters, can't just look away, they still hope that Persipasi, the original icon of Bekasi, can comeback.
In 2021, Patriot Candrabhaga merged with the Persipasi Bekasi team and competed again in Liga 3 Zone West Java under the name PCB Persipasi. PCB Persipasi is an official member of Asprov PSSI West Java and plays in Liga 3 West Java zone.
However, the merger with Patriot Chandrabhaga did not go down well with Persipasi's various supporters' groups, who alienated the new entity. Protests were held by the club's supporters, who demanded that the club were to revert their name back to Persipasi. The demands were fulfilled by Askot PSSI Bekasi once ownership of the club was transferred back to them following the conclusion of the 2021–22 Liga 3 season, with the club returning back to their original Persipasi name in May 2022. Bekasi's caretaker mayor Tri Adhianto was appointed as the club's new chairman, who was supported by not only the members of Askot PSSI Bekasi, but also by the city's footballing figures and supporters.

Players

Current squad

Coaching staff

Management

|}

Honours
 Liga 3 West Java Series 1
 Champions: 2022

References

External links

Football clubs in Indonesia
Football clubs in West Java
Association football clubs established in 2022
2022 establishments in Indonesia